Jasson Domínguez (born February 7, 2003), nicknamed El Marciano or the Martian, is a Dominican professional baseball outfielder in the New York Yankees organization.

Early life
Domínguez was born in Esperanza, a municipality of the Valverde Province in the Dominican Republic on February 7, 2003. He is the second of six children born to Felíx Domínguez and Dorca González. Felíx is a former baseball player and a fan of the New York Yankees of Major League Baseball (MLB). Felíx named his son after Yankees first baseman Jason Giambi.

Domínguez began to train for a career in baseball at the age of eight. He signed with trainer Ivan Noboa at age 13. Domínguez played as a catcher before transitioning into a center fielder. He is considered to be a five-tool player. During his training, someone referred to him as "El Marciano", Spanish for "the Martian", because his talent was not of this world. Several workout videos that he has posted on social media have gone viral. He has been compared to Mickey Mantle, Bo Jackson, and Mike Trout.

Professional career
Domínguez was ranked as the top prospect eligible to sign with an MLB team in the 2019–2020 international class. He signed with the Yankees for a franchise record $5.1 million signing bonus on July 2, 2019, receiving the majority of the Yankees' $5.4 million total allotment for international signings for the year. He did not play in 2020 due to the cancellation of the minor league baseball season resulting from the COVID-19 pandemic, and instead trained at a baseball academy in Santiago.

Domínguez began the 2021 season in extended spring training. In June, he made his professional baseball debut with the Florida Complex League Yankees of the Rookie-level Florida Complex League. He was selected to represent the Yankees in the 2021 All-Star Futures Game. Domínguez became the first prospect to appear in the All-Star Futures Game without having played in a full-season minor league. The Yankees promoted Domínguez to the Tampa Tarpons of the Low-A Southeast League after the Futures Game; he had batted 4-for-20 (.200) with six strikeouts and six walks in the Florida Complex League. Domínguez batted .258 with five home runs and 18 runs batted in (RBIs) in 49 games played.

Domínguez began the 2022 season with Tampa. He appeared in the 2022 All-Star Futures Game, and was then promoted to the Hudson Valley Renegades of the High-A South Atlantic League. When Hudson Valley's season ended, the Yankees promoted Domínguez to the Somerset Patriots of the Class AA Eastern League for their last few regular season games and their postseason.

The Yankees invited Domínguez to spring training as a non-roster player in 2023.

References

External links

2003 births
Living people
Baseball outfielders
People from Valverde Province
Florida Complex League Yankees players
Tampa Tarpons players
Dominican Republic baseball players
Hudson Valley Renegades players